William Patrick Cummins (12 April 1855 – 9 March 1907) was an Australian politician who represented the South Australian House of Assembly multi-member seat of Stanley from 1896 to 1907, representing the Australasian National League from 1902 to 1906, then the Liberal and Democratic Union from 1906 to 1907.

References

1855 births
1907 deaths
Members of the South Australian House of Assembly
19th-century Australian politicians